Dietmar Schiller is a German rower who competed for the SG Dynamo Potsdam / Sportvereinigung (SV) Dynamo. He won the medals at the international rowing competitions.

References 

East German male rowers
Living people
World Rowing Championships medalists for East Germany
Year of birth missing (living people)